Iwierzyce  is a village in Ropczyce-Sędziszów County, Subcarpathian Voivodeship, in south-eastern Poland. It is the seat of the gmina (administrative district) called Gmina Iwierzyce.

The village has a population of 940.

References
Notes

Iwierzyce